Le Bocage bourbonnais is a small French natural region, west of the Allier department in Auvergne. Its name stems from the ancient province of Bourbonnais.

Situation
Le bocage lies in the Bourbonnais natural region, west of the Allier and Cher rivers, around Cosne-d'Allier and Bourbon-l'Archambault.

It is surrounded by the following natural regions:
 Limagne bourbonnaise (south)
 Combrailles and le Boischaut Sud (west)
 le Val de Germigny et le Nivernais (north)
 Sologne bourbonnaise (east)

References

Geography of Allier